Jacques Crickillon (13 September 1940 – 11 February 2021) was a Belgian novelist, poet and essayist. He was sometimes known under the pseudonym Frank Paradis.

Biography
Crickillon studied Romanesque philology at the Université libre de Bruxelles.

His works were studied by great critics such as Jacques De Decker, Alain Bousquet, and Christophe Van Rossom. He also wrote theatrical pieces and radio shows, such as Sommeil blanc and Le Cri de Tarzan, as well as young adult novels.

Jacques Crickillon died on 11 February 2021 at the age of 80.

Bibliography
La Défendue (1968)
L'œuvre romanesque d'Albert Ayguesparse (1970)
L'Ombre du Prince (1971)
La Barrière blanche (1974)
La Guerre sainte (1975)
À visage fermé (1976)
André Miguel (1977)
Raymond Chasle L'Île-Étoile (1978)
Régions insoumises, poésie (1978)
Région interdite (1978)
«Approche de Tao» (1979)
«Cinq Récits» (1980)
Supra-Coronada (1980)
Colonie de la Mémoire (1980)
Nuit la Neige (1981)
Retour à Tawani (1983)
Parcours 109 (1983)
La Nuit du Seigneur (1984)
L'Indien de la Gare du Nord (1985)
Le Tireur birman (1987)
Grand Paradis (1988)
Sphère (1991)
Les Oreilles-Coquillages (1991)
Neuf Royaumes (1991)
Enfant avec cravate et peintures de guerre (1992)
Vide et Voyageur (1993)
Ténébrées (1993)
Contes de la plume et du papier (1993)
Ode à Lorna Lherne (1994)
Élégies d'Évolène (1995)
Talisman, poésie (1995)
Ballade de Lorna de l'Our (1996)
L'Astrolabe (1997)
Au bord des Fonderies mortes (1998)
Oberland, Montagne romantique, suivi d'Engadine et Montagne symboliste (2000)
La Chanson de Nana Sumatra (2001)
Cercle Afanema (La Défendue, L'Ombre du Prince, La Barrière blanche, La Guerre sainte, À Visage fermé) (2001)
Babylone Demain, suivi de Le Tueur birman, Parcours 109 et Supra-Coronada (2001)
A Kénalon I (2004)
A Kénalon II (2005)
Le Bois de pluie (2006)
A Kénalon I et II (2006)
Phase Terminale (2010)

References

1940 births
2021 deaths
Belgian poets in French
Members of the Académie royale de langue et de littérature françaises de Belgique
Université libre de Bruxelles alumni
Writers from Brussels